Arsenal (comics) may refer to:

DC Comics
 Nicholas Galtry, a DC Comics villain first seen in Doom Patrol #100, December 1965 (as 'Galtry') and Tales of the New Teen Titans #3, August 1982 (as 'Arsenal')
 Arsenal, a DC Comics villain first seen in Doom Patrol #113, August 1967
 Arsenal, a DC Comics villain first seen in Adventure Comics #485, September 1981
 Arsenal, alias previously used by DC Comics character Roy Harper (comics), formerly Speedy

Marvel Comics
 Arsenal (Marvel Comics), fictional character, first appeared in Iron Man #114